Traci Melchor is a Canadian television personality. She is known for her role as an entertainment reporter for CTV's series etalk and as a judge of the reality competition series Canada's Drag Race. Melchor is also the former co-host of CTV's The Social.

Early life
Originally from Pickering, Ontario, Melchor studied radio and television broadcasting at Seneca College.

Career
She joined CHUM Limited as an entertainment reporter for Citytv, later becoming a cohost of MuchMusic's RapCity. She moved to Los Angeles becoming an entertainment reporter and host for E! and taking acting roles in a number of television series, before taking a new role with MuchMusic's sister station MuchMoreMusic.

In 2008, Melchor joined CTV's eTalk as a reporter, and is currently one of their senior correspondents.

In 2020, Melchor appeared in multiple episodes of Canada's Drag Race, the Canadian edition of RuPaul's Drag Race as ‘Canada’s Squirrel Friend’ and a guest judge for the finale episode. In June 2021, it was announced that Melchor would return for the second season as a main judge alongside Brooke Lynn Hytes, Amanda Brugel, and Brad Goreski, replacing Jeffrey Bowyer-Chapman and Stacey McKenzie. Melchor also returned as a judge for the third season in 2022.

She also regularly contributes to The Marilyn Denis Show, CP24 Breakfast, CTV News, and Toronto's CHUM-FM.

Awards and nominations

References

External links

Canadian television talk show hosts
Canadian television reporters and correspondents
Black Canadian broadcasters
People from Pickering, Ontario
Living people
Black Canadian women
CTV Television Network people
Year of birth missing (living people)
Canadian women television journalists
Participants in Canadian reality television series
Canadian Screen Award winners